HMS Bridlington  was a British . She served in the Second World War in the Royal Navy, and in the Royal Air Force (RAF) from 1946-1958.

History

Royal Navy 
Bridlington was laid down on 11 September 1939 and launched on 29 February 1940. She was named after the English town Bridlington.

Second World War
After working up, she joined the 9th Minesweeping Flotilla at Scapa Flow. She later served in the Dieppe Raid and the Normandy landings. After being transferred to reserve service in 1945, she was passed on to the RAF in 1946.

Royal Air Force 
In October 1955, Bridlington sailed to Gan, in the Indian Ocean, to create a landing strip on the island. She sailed back to Plymouth in April 1956, where she was scrapped in 1958. Her nameplate and bell were salvaged, which can be seen on display at the Bridlington Harbor Heritage Museum in Bridlington.

References 

 

 

1940 ships
Bangor-class minesweepers of the Royal Navy